The 2016–17 North Texas Mean Green men's basketball team represented the University of North Texas during the 2016–17 NCAA Division I men's basketball season. The Mean Green, led by fifth-year head coach Tony Benford, played their home games at UNT Coliseum, nicknamed The Super Pit, in Denton, Texas, as members of Conference USA. They finished the season 8–22, 2–16 in C-USA play to finish in last place. They failed to qualify for the C-USA tournament.

On March 5, 2017, the school fired head coach Tony Benford after five years without a winning season. On March 13, the school hired Arkansas State head coach Grant McCasland to the same role.

Previous season 
The Mean Green finished the 2015–16 season 12–20, 7–11 in C-USA play to finish in a three-way tie for ninth place. They lost in the second round of the C-USA tournament to WKU.

Preseason 
The Mean Grean was picked to finish in 10th place in the preseason Conference USA poll. Jeremy Combs was selected to the preseason All-Conference USA team.

Departures

Incoming Transfers

Recruiting class of 2016

Roster

Schedule and results

|-
!colspan=9 style=| Non-conference regular season

|-
!colspan=12 style=| Conference USA regular season

Source

See also
2016–17 North Texas Mean Green women's basketball team

References

North Texas Mean Green men's basketball seasons
North Texas
North Texas Mean Green men's b
North Texas Mean Green men's b